The Rural Municipality of Stonehenge No. 73 is a rural municipality (RM) in the Canadian province of Saskatchewan within Census Division No. 3 and  Division No. 2. It is located in the south-central portion of the province.

History 
The RM of Stonehenge No. 73 incorporated as a rural municipality on December 11, 1911.

Geography

Communities and localities 
The following urban municipalities are surrounded by the RM.

Villages
Limerick

The following unincorporated communities are within the RM.

Organized hamlets
Congress

Demographics 

Government 
The RM of Stonehenge No. 73 is governed by an elected municipal council and an appointed administrator that meets on the second Monday of every month. The reeve of the RM is Chris Sinclair while its administrator is Tammy Franks. The RM's office is located in Limerick.

Transportation 
The RM is a part owner of the Fife Lake Railway.

References 

 
Stonehodge
Division No. 3, Saskatchewan